Elections were held in the state of Western Australia on 30 March 1974 to elect all 51 members to the Legislative Assembly and 15 members to the 30-seat Legislative Council. The one-term Labor government, led by Premier John Tonkin, was defeated by the Liberal Party, led by Opposition Leader Charles Court.

Overview
The Liberal Party won the election after a campaign focused mostly on inflation, industrial unrest, states' rights and education. The outgoing Tonkin government had had a turbulent ride in its three years of office, having only a one-seat majority in the Assembly and being outnumbered two-to-one in the Council.

The 15-month-old Whitlam Labor federal government had proven unpopular in Western Australia which saw it as taking a centralist view towards federal-state affairs, and Whitlam himself was hit by a soft drink can and a tomato whilst addressing voters at Forrest Place during the campaign. The Country Party had tentatively merged with the Democratic Labor Party in the period preceding the election, going to the voters as the National Alliance which put forward a centrist platform—however, they lost both votes and seats as compared to the 1971 election in doing so. Arthur Bickerton, the member for Pilbara, became the first Minister to be defeated at an election since 1939.

To form a parliamentary majority, the National Country Party under its new leader, Ray McPharlin, agreed to form a coalition with the Liberals after the election, and negotiated three seats in the Ministry.

Results

Legislative Assembly

|}

Notes:
 604,222 electors were enrolled to vote at the election, but one seat, Mount Marshall, held by the National Alliance's Ray McPharlin and representing 6,887 electors, was uncontested.
 The Western Australian Country Party agreed to a trial merger with the Democratic Labor Party prior to the election, known as the "National Alliance". They contested 44 seats including many in the metropolitan area. The Alliance ceased to exist shortly after the 1974 election, and the National Country Party adopted a more traditional strategy for subsequent elections.

Legislative Council

|}

 604,222 electors were enrolled to vote at the election, but one seat, Central Province, held by the National Alliance and representing 22,438 electors, was uncontested.

Post-election pendulum

See also
 Members of the Western Australian Legislative Assembly, 1971–1974
 Members of the Western Australian Legislative Assembly, 1974–1977
 Candidates of the 1974 Western Australian state election

References

Elections in Western Australia
1974 elections in Australia
1970s in Western Australia
March 1974 events in Australia